Shout Out Louds is a Swedish indie pop band from Stockholm.

History 

Formed in Stockholm by childhood friends Adam Olenius (vocals), Ted Malmros (bass), and Carl von Arbin (guitars), Shout Out Louds found an international audience during the early 2000s with their peppy Swedish pop. The lineup began taking shape in 2001, with drummer Eric Edman and keyboardist Bebban Stenborg climbing aboard shortly thereafter. Shout Out Louds wasted little time writing songs, the first three of which formed the basis of their first demo tape. The music caught the ear of Filip Wilén, owner of Sweden's Bud Fox Recordings, and he quickly signed the group to his label. Shout Out Louds then spent the majority of 2002 writing more songs, and December found them recording their debut EP, 100°, which was released in 2003. The group's high-energy, ultra-melodic sound was in place from the very beginning.

The band toured Sweden and Scandinavia in support of 100°, whose release was followed by two singles, "Hurry Up Let's Go" and "Shut Your Eyes." In October 2003, the group released its first album, Howl Howl Gaff Gaff, to great acclaim in Sweden. The band spent the following year touring, releasing additional material ("Please Please Please," "Very Loud/Wish I Was Dead," and the Oh, Sweetheart EP), and inking an American deal with Capitol Records. The U.S. version of Howl Howl Gaff Gaff was released in May 2005, featuring songs from the Swedish release plus some early singles and EP tracks. A tour of the U.S. with indie darlings the Dears helped boost the band's profile, as did airplay on The O.C. Despite such growing success, the band's 2007 album "Our Ill Wills" produced by Björn Yttling was a somber, melancholy affair, replete with icy synths and Cure-inspired vocals. Another round of tour dates kept the bandmates busy until mid-2008, at which point they decided to take a half-year hiatus. March 2009 found the musicians reconvening in Stockholm to write new material, and by August the band had decamped to Seattle to begin recording with producer Phil Ek. Their third album, Work, arrived in early 2010. After coming home from a tour to support the album, the band members felt that a change in the way they worked was in order. Hoping to recapture the more relaxed spirit of earlier recordings, they spent time outside the studio composing the songs, with each band member responsible for coming up with their own parts. When they came back together, the band produced their next record themselves (with help from Johannes Berglund) in a small Stockholm studio. Optica was released by Merge in early 2013. The next few years saw a handful of solo releases from both Olenius and from Stenborg's Astropol project. Regrouping in Stockholm, the Shout Out Louds returned with 2017's more guitar-oriented Ease My Mind.

Band members 

 Adam Olenius – vocals, guitar
 Ted Malmros – bass, percussion, backing vocals
 Carl von Arbin – guitar, backing vocals
 Eric Edman – drums
 Bebban Stenborg – occasional lead vocals, keyboards, accordion, glockenspiel, moog, backing vocals

Discography

Studio albums

EPs 
100° EP (2003)
Oh, Sweetheart EP (2004)
Very Loud EP (2004)
Combines EP (Remixes) (2006)

Singles

Compilations 
SXSW: The Best of the West EP (15 March 2005) – "Never Ever"
DRIVE XV: A Tribute to Automatic for the People (2 October 2008) – "Man on the Moon"

References

External links 

Official website

Shout Out Louds entry at The Indie Music Database
Lyrics at Lyricpages.com 

Swedish rock music groups
Swedish indie rock groups
English-language singers from Sweden
Musical groups established in 2001
Merge Records artists